Wolfe's Neck Woods State Park is a public recreation area located on Casco Bay on the southeastern side of Freeport, Maine. The state park occupies  on a narrow peninsula, Wolfe's Neck, that runs between Casco Bay and the Harraseeket River. It includes white pine and hemlock forests, salt marsh estuary, and rocky shore. The park is managed by the Maine Department of Agriculture, Conservation and Forestry.

History
Wolfe's Neck takes its name from Henry and Rachel Woolfe, the area's first permanent European settlers who took up residence in 1733. During the 20th century, the land was the site of an organic beef-raising operation owned by Lawrence M.C. Smith and Eleanor Houston Smith. The state park was created when the Smiths donated a portion of their holdings to the state in 1969. The park opened to the public in 1972.

Activities and amenities
The park offers hiking, birdwatching, picnicking, cross-country skiing, and snowshoeing. Park trails traverse both forested lands and rocky shoreline, offering views of the river and bay. Osprey can be observed nesting on Googins Island, which lies just off shore.

References

External links

Wolfe's Neck Woods State Park Department of Agriculture, Conservation and Forestry
Wolfe's Neck Woods State Park Map Department of Agriculture, Conservation and Forestry

Freeport, Maine
Protected areas of Cumberland County, Maine
Protected areas established in 1969
Hiking trails in Maine
1969 establishments in Maine
State parks of Maine